The Bodmin and Wenford Railway (BWR) is a heritage railway, based at Bodmin in Cornwall, England. It has an interchange with the national rail network at Bodmin Parkway railway station, the southern terminus of the line.

History
The line closed on 3 October 1983 following the demise of freight traffic from Wenford.

In 1984, the Bodmin Railway Preservation Society was formed, and they held their first open day at Bodmin General two years later; 1987 saw the Cornish Steam Locomotive Society move their equipment from Bugle to Bodmin.

A Light Railway Order was granted in 1989, and the following year passenger services recommenced between Bodmin General and Bodmin Road, although by now that station had been renamed "Bodmin Parkway".

Route

The stations served are all in or near Bodmin. They are:
 
 
 
 

On leaving Bodmin Parkway, the route first crosses the River Fowey by a five-arch viaduct, and then climbs up towards Bodmin Moor. The one intermediate halt is at Colesloggett Halt, built by the BWR in 1993 to serve a farm park (now closed), and provides access to a network of footpaths through the Cardinham Woods, belonging to the Forestry Commission. The trip takes 25 minutes each way.

Upon reaching Bodmin General station, the headquarters of the railway, trains reverse to take the line to Boscarne Junction. The railway aspires to extend alongside this foot/cyclepath towards Wadebridge in the future.

Signalling
The railway is controlled by lower quadrant semaphore signals.  Access to the Network Rail mainline at Bodmin is controlled by a lever frame, under the supervision of NR's Lostwithiel signal box.

Rolling Stock

For a Full list of Locomotives, Carriages and Wagons

Main line steam locomotives

 4612 – built in 1942. One of the familiar GWR 5700 Class 0-6-0PT pannier tank locomotives that operated out of St Blazey engine shed for use on the china clay branch lines. Its boiler certificate expires in 2023.
 5552 – a GWR 4575 Class  familiar from operating passenger trains on most of the Cornish branch lines. Built in 1928. Currently undergoing overhaul at Bodmin General and painted in British Railways lined green livery.
It was withdrawn on 12 October 1964 and entered preservation with the Dart Valley Railway on 17 October 1965. Its boiler certificate expires in 2022 but is currently (2016) operational and in British Railways lined green livery.

Main line diesel locomotives

 D3452 – a British Rail Class 10  diesel-electric (DE) shunting locomotive. After withdrawal by British Rail in July 1968, it was sold to English China Clays for further service. It spent much of its subsequent time at Fowey shunting china clay trains. It was bought for preservation in March 1989 and was put to work at Bodmin. 
 08359  - another Class 08 shunting loco. Built at Crewe Works in March 1958 and originally numbered D3429. The loco was first allocated to Bristol St Phillips Marsh, but later moved to South Wales where it spent the rest of its revenue earning life. With the decline in coal production, the loco was withdrawn in January 1984 entering straight into preservation. The loco is owned by Kent based The Diesel Electric Shunter Company and was delivered on hire to the Bodmin and Wenford Railway in March 2022. 08359 is the oldest surviving diesel loco built by Crewe Works.
 08444  – another Class 08 shunting locomotive. This was the first diesel to arrive on the Bodmin and Wenford Railway, delivered in March 1987 from Cardiff Canton TMD. It was originally number D3559 but later became 08444, which is the number it carries at Bodmin. Operational BR Green
 37142 – a British Rail Class 37 type 3 Co-Co BR blue. Built in 1963. During preparation on Saturday morning of the 2009 autumn diesel gala, 37142 was found to have contaminated oil. Early examination showed a sudden water leakage from at least two liners.
 47306 – BR Co–Co Class 47 named The Sapper.
 50042 – BR Co–Co Class 50 named after the warship Triumph BR blue. Built in 1968, it was taken out of service from Laira TMD at Plymouth in October 1990. Although it had only been overhauled three months earlier, its bogies were exchanged after withdrawal for one with worn out wheels and some parts stolen. It was restored sufficiently to move under its own power by November 1992 and was placed in service the following year.

Diesel multiple units

 BR Class 108 unit
 M50980 British Rail green, operational
 M52054 British Rail green, operational
 M51947 British Rail blue and grey, stored for spares
These units were built by Derby Litchurch Lane Works from 1958 to 1961, and were one of the most numerous types of 1950s DMUs.

Industrial locomotives
 19 – a Bagnall . In 2016 it is awaiting overhaul at Bodmin Parkway; painted in HM Devonport Dockyard maroon.
 2766 – a Hunslet Austerity 0-6-0ST. Operational after restoration was completed in 2017. Painted in WD Green. Boiler ticket expires in 2027.
 3121 – a Bagnall . Being a fireless locomotive, it has a steam reservoir but not a boiler, so it will need an external boiler to charge it should it ever move under its own power. Stored as of 2016.

 Alfred – one of the two ex-Port of Par Bagnall 0-4-0STs. Alfred and its older sister engine Judy (see below) were the inspiration for Bill and Ben in Wilbert Awdry's The Railway Series children's books. Port of Par green colour. Awaiting overhaul at Bodmin General.
 Brian – Brian is a  Ruston Hornsby shunter. Named after the late Brian Shadwick, the loco came to Bodmin General in early 2009 for a repaint and routine maintenance. The loco is used as the shed pilot at Bodmin Parkway. Operational in 2016 and carrying HM Devonport Dockyard maroon livery.
 Denise – Sentinel diesel shunter . As of 2016 awaiting restoration; painted orange.
 Judy – the older of the two ex-Port of Par Bagnall 0-4-0STs, it was on display at a china clay museum for many years but was moved to Bodmin and entered service at Easter 2009 following a major overhaul. Painted in Port of Par green colour. Stored awaiting overhaul.
 Peter - a Folwer  Diesel. Undergoing restoration in 2016 at Bodmin General; painted green.

RailTrail Project

The railway company is currently planning to extend beyond its western terminus at Boscarne Junction towards Wadebridge alongside the Camel Trail. Known as the RailTrail project, phase one would see the railway extended to Nanstallon Halt, phase two to Grogley Halt and phase three to Wadebridge Guineaport.

A separate company (Bodmin & Wadebridge Railway Company) has been set up. It is responsible to the Directors of the Bodmin & Wenford Railway for the promotion and management of all aspects relating to the RailTrail project.

In areas where the width of the trackbed does not allow both a railway and a footpath side-by-side, short diversions are proposed. For example, at Grogley, the Camel Trail could be re-routed along a former "headshunt", which was part of the original railway before it was replaced by a later deviation.

The RailTrail project is viewed by some as somewhat controversial due to the following concerns.

 Sustrans and the cycling/running/walking/equestrian communities have objected to these plans for the RailTrail project, claiming they do not provide significant evidence that a wide-enough multi-purpose trail can be provided. They consider the Camel Trail is currently too narrow at the Boscarne junction terminus due to the railway.
 Some environmentalists have expressed concerns about the impact that the RailTrail project would have on the Site of Special Scientific Interest and Special Area of Conservation of the Camel valley.
 People living in the Guineaport area of Wadebridge have expressed concerns about having a rail terminus situated there, in the belief that space for a platform and car parking is inadequate.

The decision of North Cornwall District Council to support the project was "a close fought battle", won only by the casting vote of Councillor Graham Facks-Martin.

See also

 Rolling stock of the Bodmin and Wenford Railway
 List of closed railway stations in Britain
 List of railway stations in Cornwall

References

External links
 

 
Heritage railways in Cornwall
Standard gauge railways in England